In general relativity, a naked singularity is a hypothetical gravitational singularity without an event horizon. In a black hole, the singularity is completely enclosed by a boundary known as the event horizon, inside which the curvature of spacetime caused by the singularity is so strong that light cannot escape. Hence, objects inside the event horizon—including the singularity itself—cannot be directly observed. A naked singularity, by contrast, would be observable from the outside.

The theoretical existence of naked singularities is important because their existence would mean that it would be possible to observe the collapse of an object to infinite density. It would also cause foundational problems for general relativity, because general relativity cannot make predictions about the evolution of space-time near a singularity. In generic black holes, this is not a problem, as an outside viewer cannot observe the space-time within the event horizon.

Naked singularities have not been observed in nature. Astronomical observations of black holes indicate that their rate of rotation falls below the threshold to produce a naked singularity (spin parameter 1). GRS 1915+105 comes closest to the limit, with a spin parameter of 0.82-1.00.

According to the cosmic censorship hypothesis, gravitational singularities may not be observable.  If loop quantum gravity is correct, naked singularities may be possible in nature.

Predicted formation
From concepts drawn from rotating black holes, it is shown that a singularity, spinning rapidly, can become a ring-shaped object. This results in two event horizons, as well as an ergosphere, which draw closer together as the spin of the singularity increases. When the outer and inner event horizons merge, they shrink toward the rotating singularity and eventually expose it to the rest of the universe.

A singularity rotating fast enough might be created by the collapse of dust or by a supernova of a fast-spinning star. Studies of pulsars and some computer simulations (Choptuik, 1997) have been performed.

Mathematician Demetrios Christodoulou, a winner of the Shaw Prize, has shown that contrary to what had been expected, singularities which are not hidden in a black hole also occur. However, he then showed that such "naked singularities" are unstable.

Metrics

Disappearing event horizons exist in the Kerr metric, which is a spinning black hole in a vacuum.  Specifically, if the angular momentum is high enough, the event horizons could disappear.  Transforming the Kerr metric to Boyer–Lindquist coordinates, it can be shown that the  coordinate (which is not the radius) of the event horizon is

 

However, this corresponds to a case where  exceeds  (or in Planck units, i.e. the spin exceeds what is normally viewed as the upper limit of its physically possible values.

Disappearing event horizons can also be seen with the Reissner–Nordström geometry of a charged black hole.  In this metric, it can be shown that the horizons occur at

 

However, this corresponds to a case where  exceeds  (or in Planck units, i.e. the charge exceeds what is normally viewed as the upper limit of its physically possible values.

See Kerr–Newman metric for a spinning, charged ring singularity.

Effects
A naked singularity could allow scientists to observe an infinitely dense material, which would under normal circumstances be impossible by the cosmic censorship hypothesis. Without an event horizon of any kind, some speculate that naked singularities could actually emit light.

Cosmic censorship hypothesis
The cosmic censorship hypothesis says that a gravitational singularity would remain hidden by the event horizon. LIGO events, including GW150914, are consistent with these predictions.  Although data anomalies would have resulted in the case of a singularity, the nature of those anomalies remains unknown.

Some research has suggested that if loop quantum gravity is correct, then naked singularities could exist in nature, implying that the cosmic censorship hypothesis does not hold. Numerical calculations and some other arguments have also hinted at this possibility.

In fiction
 M. John Harrison's Kefahuchi Tract trilogy of science fiction novels (Light, Nova Swing and Empty Space) centre upon humanity's exploration of a naked singularity.
 "Dark Peril" by James C. Glass (published in Analog March 2005), is a story about space travelers on an exploratory mission. While they investigate a strange cosmological phenomenon, their two small space crafts begin to shake, and they are unable to leave the area.  One crew member realizes that they are trapped in the ergosphere of a black hole or naked singularity. The story describes a cluster of multiple black holes or singularities, and what the crew does to try to survive this seemingly inescapable situation.
 Stephen Baxter's Xeelee Sequence features the Xeelee, who create a massive ring that produces a naked singularity. It is used to travel to another universe.
 In the episode titled "Daybreak", the finale of the 2004 reimagined television series Battlestar Galactica, the Cylon colony orbits a naked singularity.
 The Sleeping God in Peter Hamilton's The Night's Dawn Trilogy is believed to be a naked singularity.
 In Christopher Nolan's Interstellar the nonexistence of a naked singularity hinders humanity from completing a theory of quantum gravity due to the inaccessibility of experimental data from inside the event horizon.
 In the visual novel Steins;Gate, a naked singularity is used to compress the digitalized memories of the protagonist into a smaller size, to then be sent back in time with an improvised "time leap machine".
 In Vonda McIntyre's 1981 Star Trek novel, The Entropy Effect, a naked singularity is found to be a side effect of time travel experimentation, and threatens to destroy the universe if the time travel experiments are not stopped before they started.

See also 

 Black hole electron
 Gravitational singularity
 Ring singularity

References

Further reading
 
 Pankaj S. Joshi, "Do Naked Singularities Break the Rules of Physics?", Scientific American, January 2009.
 Marcus Chown, "Fast-spinning black holes might reveal all" New Scientist, August 2009.

Black holes